The 2023 U Sports Women's Final 8 Basketball Tournament was held March 9–12, 2023, in Sydney, Nova Scotia, to determine a national champion for the 2022–23 U Sports women's basketball season. The top-seeded Carleton Ravens defeated the third-seeded Queen's Gaels in the gold medal game to win the second national championship in program history.

Host
The tournament was hosted by Cape Breton University at the school's Sullivan Field House, which was the first time that Cape Breton had hosted the championship game. It was the second time that the tournament was played in Nova Scotia and the first time since 1980 when it was hosted by Dalhousie University.

Participating teams

Championship bracket

Consolation bracket

References

External links
 Tournament Web Site

U Sports Women's Basketball Championship
2022–23 in Canadian basketball
2023 in women's basketball
Cape Breton University
March 2023 sports events in Canada
2023 in Nova Scotia
Sport in the Cape Breton Regional Municipality